Chalay Thay Saath is a 2017 Pakistani romance film directed by Umer Adil with producer Beenish Umer &  Executive Producer Sheikh Shiraz Mubashir starring Syra Shehroz, Osama Tahir, Zhalay Sarhadi, Behroze Sabzwari, Mansha Pasha, Faris Khalid, Kent S. Leung, Shamim Halai and Sherbaaz Kaleem. It is executively produced by Sheikh Shiraz Mubashir.  The film was released on 21 April 2017.

Plot
The film is based around the character of Resham, a doctor who is on a journey to discover her past and future alongside her friends. The film depicts a cross-border love story between a Chinese man and Resham, which ends in their marriage.

Cast
 Syra Shehroz as Resham
 Kent S Leung as Adam
 Osama Tahir as Zain
 Mansha Pasha as Tania
 Zhalay Sarhadi 
 Behroze Sabzwari
Faris Khalid
 Shamim Hilaly
Sherbaaz Kaleem

Production

Casting
The ensemble cast includes Syra Shahroz playing the character of Resham, a doctor on the road to discover her personal past and future. Kent S. Leung's character is playing the love interest of Syra's character Resham.  Faris Khalid, Osama Tahir, Mansha Pasha and Zhalay Sarhadi all will play the roles of Resham's friends. Veteran actors Behroz Subzwari and Shamim Hilali play important roles as the story unfolds with Sherbaaz Kaleem brings in the local Hunza feel with his narrative

Filming
The film is focused the Hunza culture and it was shot in the Northern Areas of Pakistan in the region of Gilgit-Baltistan It took the film crew over 40 days to complete the film shoot in the Hunza region.

Release
The film was released on 21 April 2017 in Pakistan. The Film was later released in Hong Kong, China in 2018.

Box office
The film opened up to mainly empty cinemas. The film collected 75 lacs in its first week. The film hardly ran for 3 weeks in cinemas and grossed 1.5 crores in its lifetime run in Pakistan. The film was also later released in Hong Kong. Reports suggested that the film opened to a full house in Hong Kong.

Critical reception
The film generally received mixed reviews but critics mainly criticised its script. Hamna Zubair of Images Dawn praised the actors but said that "The film is proof that without clear vision and a tight script even the most talented performers fail to impress". Rafay  of the Express Tribune gave it 2 out of 5 stars and wrote that "One wonders how many talented people are going to bear the brunt of shallow characters and pointless plots on their way to big screen recognition". Hira Aftab of Youlin Magazine praised the actors and Umer Adil's direction and wrote that "Overall, though, Chalay Thay Saath is a must-watch for anyone who wants to witness the new direction of Pakistani cinema and the increasing depth of the Pak-China bond". Momin Ali Munshi of Galaxy Lollywood rated 3 out of 5 stars and wrote that "Not the best film to have come out of Pakistan in recent times, but not the worst either. Makes for a decent watch, and you leave the cinema hall with a smile on your face". While criticizing its script, Shahjehan Saleem of Something Haute praised its cinematography and all in all gave it 3.5 out of 5 stars and wrote that "With all of its ups, and really only a few downs, one must go watch Chalay Thay Saath and judge through their own interpretation".

Aniq Arshad  of Dubai Desi rated 4.5 out of 5 stars and wrote, "Under the balanced direction of Umer Adil, Chalay Thay Saath is a complete entertainer and has the ability to connet with the audience. You will not only laugh at the witty jokes but will also cry along with the cast". He also mentioned that "It is indeed a movie worth watching with family and friends".

Hala Syed of Edition.pk gave a positive review and gave the verdict "Chalay Thay Saath, is a movie that meanders so delightfully that it doesn't much matter where we end up".

Hussain Tariq of Geo.Tv gave a rating of  3 out of 5 stars (6.5/10) and wrote, "Though the film has its shortfalls, it is not difficult to look past them. Chalay Thay Saath is a feel-good movie – the kind we need more of to lift our cinema from its embryonic stage". Sohail Javed of Fuchsia.Sg gave a positive review and wrote, "Pure, clean, humble Pakistan film made with a honest heart".

Accolades

See also
 List of Pakistani films of 2017

References

External links

2017 romantic drama films
2017 films
2010s Urdu-language films
Films about interracial romance
Films shot in Gilgit-Baltistan
Pakistani romantic drama films
Films set in Gilgit-Baltistan
Military of Pakistan in films